This is a list of nomadic people arranged by economic specialization and region.

Nomadic people are communities who move from one place to another, rather than settling permanently in one location. Many cultures have traditionally been nomadic, but nomadic behavior is increasingly rare in industrialized countries.

Hunter-gatherers 

Nomadic hunting and gathering, following seasonally available wild plants and game, is the oldest human method of subsistence.

Africa 

 Hadza people
 Pygmies
Twa people
Mbuti
 San people

Americas 

 Abenaki
 Aché
 Alaskan Athabaskans
 Aleut
 Alutiiq
 Apache
 Beothuk
 Cheyenne
 Chichimeca
 Chiquillanes
 Chitimacha
 Chumash
 Chono
 Clovis culture
 Cody complex
 Comanches
 Crow
 Dalton tradition
 Dene
 Dorset culture
 Eyak
 Folsom culture
 Greenlandic Inuit
 Guarani
 Haida
 Hell Gap complex
 Indigenous peoples of California
 Ingalik
 Innu
 Inuit
 Iñupiat
 Karankawa
 Kawésqar
 Koyukon
 Lakota
 Makah
 Maritime Archaic
 Menominee
 Navajo (until the sixteenth century with the introduction of sheep, and the adoption of agriculture from the Puebloans)
 Nez Perce
 Norton tradition
 Nukak-Makú
 Ojibwe
 Oshara tradition
 Oxbow complex
 Paiute
 Paleo-Arctic tradition
 Pirahã
 Plains Indians
 Plano culture
 Puelche
 Red Ocher people
 Red Paint People
 Sioux (from around the 17th century onwards, they were previously a farming people who lived in the Ohio River Valley)
 Tehuelche
 Thule people
 Tlingit
 Utes
 Yaghan
 Yahi
 Yanomami
 Yupik

Asia 

 Adivasi
 Aeta
 Ainu
 Altai
 Andamanese
 Great Andamanese
 Jarawa
 Lodha
 Onge
 Sabar
 Sentinelese
 Shompen
 Ati
 Mongolian
 Batek
 Chukchi
 Denisova hominine
 Dolgans
 Kazakh {before USSR}
 Ket
 Meenas
 Nganasan
 Nicobarese
 Papuans
 Penan
 Raute
 Sakai
 Selkup
 Semang
 Siberian Yupik
 Yakuts
 Homo erectus (Paleolithic era)

Oceania 
 Most Indigenous Australians prior to Western contact

 Spinifex People
 Tasmanian Aborigines
 Tiwi

 Most Papuans prior to Western contact

Europe 

 Cro-Magnon
 Aurignacian
 Gravettian
 Magdalenian
 Hamburg
 Solutrean
 Neanderthals (during the Paleolithic)
 Sami (formerly, up until the fifteenth century)

Pastoralists 

Pastoralists raise herds, driving them or moving with them, in patterns that normally avoid depleting pastures beyond their ability to recover. The pastoralists are sedentary, remaining within a local area, but moving between permanent spring, summer, autumn and winter (or dry and wet season) pastures for their livestock.

Africa 

 Ababdeh
 Afars
 Beja
 Berbers
 Borana Oromo
 Dinka
 Fulanis
 Gabra
 Karamojong
 Maasai (originally, now settled or semi-nomadic)
 Mrazig of Tunisia
 Nuer
 Pokot
 Rendille
 Sahrawis
 Samburu
 Somalis
 Tuaregs
 Toubou
 Trekboers
 Turkana

Americas 

 Nukak
 Navajo

Asia 

 Some Komi
 Ahir
 Altay people
 Baloch
 Balti
 Banjara
 Chukchi
 Dhangar
 Dukha
 Enets people
 Evenk people
 Evens
 Gaddis
 Gaderia
 Gavli
 Gujjar only in Gilgit Baltistan, Kashmir, and parts of Khyber Pakhtunkhwa
 Gujar
 Hmong
 Huns
 Jat
 Khanty people
 Koryaks
 Kuchi
 Kurumbar
 Maldhari pastoralist groups of Kutch
 Mansi people
 Moken
 Mongols
 Nenetses
 Tarkhans 
 Tibetans (primarily the Changpa at present)
 Turkic (ancient, medieval age)
 Turkic (present)
 Xiongnu 
 Yukaghirs
 Ahir
 Bafan
 Bayad
 Bharwad
 Bulgars (briefly, between the conquest of the hypothetical Kingdom of Balhara and the formation of Great Bulgaria)
 Charan
 Crimean Tatars (certain groups)
 Cumans (up until the formation of the country Wallachia/Basarabia)
 Halaypotra
 Hingora
 Jat
 Karakalpaks
 Kathi
 Kazakhs
 Ker
 Khakas
 Khant
 Khazars
 Kipchaks
 Kyrgyz
 Me
 Meta Qureshi
 Mutwa
 Node
 Nogais
 Pancholi
 Avars
 Paratharia
 Pechenegs
 Qashqai
 Rabari
 Raysipotra
 Royma
 Samma
 Sandhai Muslims
 Sanghar
 Seljuks (during the Middle Ages anyway)
 Shahsevan
 Soomra
 Sorathia
 Theba
 Turkmens
 Tuvans
 Wagher
 Warya
 Yörük
 some northern Yakuts
 Shors
 Soyots
 Telengits
 Teleuts
 Tofalar
 Tozhu Tuvans
 Tsaatan
 Wakhi
 In Afghanistan
 Kuchis (Kochai)
 Hephthalites
 Hunas
 Kouchi of Afghanistan

Europe 

 Albanians (historically)
 Bashkirs
 Germanic peoples (ancient, early medieval age)
 Magyars (ancient, early medieval age)
 Sarakatsani
 Serbian people (to late medieval period)
 Slavic peoples (ancient, early medieval age)
 Some reindeer-herding Sami communities
 Vaqueiros de alzada

West Asia 

 In Iran
 َAshayer
 Qashqaie
 Bakhtiari
 Khamseh
 Baloch
 In Iraq
 Bedouin
 Alans
 Dahae
 Parni
 Parthians
 Sarmatians
 Scythians
 Mitanni
 Turkmen

Popular Misconceptions
The Manchus are mistaken by some as nomadic people when in fact they were not nomads, but instead were a sedentary agricultural people who lived in fixed villages, farmed crops, practiced hunting and mounted archery.

The Sushen used flint headed wooden arrows, farmed, hunted, and fished, and lived in caves and trees. The cognates Sushen or Jichen (稷真) again appear in the Shan Hai Jing and Book of Wei during the dynastic era referring to Tungusic Mohe tribes of the far northeast. The Mohe enjoyed eating pork, practiced pig farming extensively, and were mainly sedentary, and also used both pig and dog skins for coats. They were predominantly farmers and grew soybean, wheat, millet, and rice, in addition to engaging in hunting.

The Jurchens were sedentary, settled farmers with advanced agriculture. They farmed grain and millet as their cereal crops, grew flax, and raised oxen, pigs, sheep, and horses. Their farming way of life was very different from the pastoral nomadism of the Mongols and the Khitan on the steppes. "At the most", the Jurchen could only be described as "semi-nomadic" while the majority of them were sedentary.

The Manchu way of life (economy) was described as agricultural, farming crops and raising animals on farms. Manchus practiced Slash-and-burn agriculture in the areas north of Shenyang. The Haixi Jurchens were "semi-agricultural, the Jianzhou Jurchens and Maolian (毛怜) Jurchens were sedentary, while hunting and fishing was the way of life of the "Wild Jurchens". Han Chinese society resembled that of the sedentary Jianzhou and Maolian, who were farmers. Hunting, archery on horseback, horsemanship, livestock raising, and sedentary agriculture were all practiced by the Jianzhou Jurchens as part of their culture. In spite of the fact that the Manchus practiced archery on horse back and equestrianism, the Manchu's immediate progenitors practiced sedentary agriculture. Although the Manchus also partook in hunting, they were sedentary. Their primary mode of production was farming while they lived in villages, forts, and towns surrounded by walls. Farming was practiced by their Jurchen Jin predecessors.

For political reasons, the Jurchen leader Nurhaci chose variously to emphasize either differences or similarities in lifestyles with other peoples like the Mongols. Nurhaci said to the Mongols that "The languages of the Chinese and Koreans are different, but their clothing and way of life is the same. It is the same with us Manchus (Jušen) and Mongols. Our languages are different, but our clothing and way of life is the same." Later Nurhaci indicated that the bond with the Mongols was not based in any real shared culture. It was for pragmatic reasons of "mutual opportunism", since Nurhaci said to the Mongols: "You Mongols raise livestock, eat meat and wear pelts. My people till the fields and live on grain. We two are not one country and we have different languages."

Peripatetic 
Peripatetic nomads offer the skills of a craft or trade to the settled populations among whom they travel. They are the most common remaining nomadic peoples in industrialized nations. Most, or all, of the following ethnonyms probably do not correspond to one community; many are locally or regionally used (sometimes as occupational names), others are used only by group members, and still others are used pejoratively only by outsiders. Most peripatetic nomads have traditions that they originate from South Asia. In India there are said to be home of over two hundred such groups. Many peripatetic groups in Iran, Afghanistan and Turkey still speak dialects of Indo-Aryan, such as the Ghorbati. There is also academic scholarship that connects European Romany groups with India.

India 

 In India:
 Abdal
 Aheria
 Bakho
 Bangali
 Bansphor
 Bazigar
 Bede
 Boria
 Changar
 Deha
 Dharhi
 Dharkar
 Domba
 Gandhila
 Habura
 Heri
 Hurkiya
 Kalabaz
 Kan
 Kanjar
 Karwal
 Kela
 Mirasi
 Mirshikar
 Nat
 Pamaria
 Patharkat
 Perna
 Qalandar
 Sansi
 Sapera Muslims
 Sapera
 Sapuria

Pakistan 

 In Pakistan:
 Churigar
 Dom
 Kanjar
 Lori
 Mirasi
 Qalandar

Turkey 

 In Turkey:
 Abdal of Turkey
 Arabci
 Bosha
 Çingene
 Gäwändi
 Ghorbati
 Qeraçi
 Susmani
 Tahtacı

Afghanistan 

 In Afghanistan:
 Kuchi (Kochai)
 Badyanesin
 Balatumani
 Chalu
 Changar
 Chighalbf
 Ghalbelbaf
 Ghorbat (Qurbat)
 Herati
 Jalili
 Jat
 Juggi
 Jola
 Kouli
 Kuṭaṭa
 Lawani
 Luli Mogat
 Maskurahi
 Musalli
 Nausar
 Pikraj
 Qawal
 Sabzaki
 Sadu
 Shadibaz (Shadiwan)
 Sheikh Mohammadi tribe
 Noristani
 Siyahpayak
 Vangawala (Bangṛiwal/Churifrosh)

Middle East 

 In Iran:
 Orak
 Asheq
 Challi
 Changi
 Chareshmal (Krishmal)
 Dumi
 Feuj
 Ghajar
 Ghorbati (Ghorbat, Gurbat, Qurbati)
 Gurani
 Haddad (Ahangar, Hasanpur)
 Howihar
 Juki
 Karachi
 Kenchli
 Kowli (Kuli)
 Luri
 Luti
 Mehtar
 Ojuli
 Qarbalband
 Sazandeh
 Suzmani
 Tat
 Toshmal
 In Iraq:
 Dom
 Kowli (Kuli)
 Zott
 In Syria:
 Dom
 Nawar

Europe 

 Romani people
 Sinti
 Manush
 Romanichal
 Romanisæl
 Iberian Kale (Gitanos)
 Finnish Kale
 Welsh Kale
 Scottish Travellers 
 New Age travellers
 Irish Travellers or Pavees
 Indigenous Norwegian Travellers or Reisende
 Yenish (German Travellers)
 Mercheros
 Camminanti

North America 

 Irish Travelers
 Romani people
 Carnies
 Oogles

References 

Nomads
Modern nomads